Michelle Lea Desyin Slawecki Hanlon (born August 8, 1965) is an American space lawyer and space law professor. She is the co-founder, president and chief executive officer of For All Moonkind, president of the National Space Society, co-director of the Center for Air and Space Law at the University of Mississippi School of Law.

In July 2017, Hanlon co-founded For All Moonkind with Tim Hanlon. It is a nonprofit organization protecting human cultural heritage in outer space. The organization is a permanent observer to the United Nations Committee on the Peaceful Uses of Outer Space. It advocates internationally, including with the United Nations Committee on the Peaceful Uses of Outer Space, for the development of protocols to identify and protect human history in space.

Hanlon serves on the advisory board of several start-ups involved in commercial space activities, including orbital debris removal, remote sensing, and the support of lunar resource extraction.  In 2021, Hanlon joined the Advisory Council of The Hague Institute for Global Justice Off-World Approach, created to serve as a platform "where leading experts in space enterprise can work to develop a rule of law in space that is flexible, inclusive, and permissive for the next generation of space adventurers to excel."

Hanlon is the editor-in-chief of each of the Journal of Space Law and the Journal of Drone Law and Policy. She serves as co-director of the Master of Laws program in the Center for Air and Space Law at the University of Mississippi School of Law.

Education
Hanlon completed high school in 1983 at the Kent School, Kent, Connecticut. In 1987, Hanlon received a B.A. in political science at Yale College. She earned a Juris Doctor degree from Georgetown University Law Center in 1992.

Later in 2017, she studied air and space law at McGill University and graduated from the McGill University Faculty of Law with a Master of Laws degree in air and space law.

References

Further reading
 Michelle L.D. Hanlon, 2021, Due Regard and Safety Zones: Understanding the Commercial Implications of Recent Policy and Legislation, NASA
 Michelle L.D. Hanlon, 2020, The Artemis Accords: What Are They and Will They Work?, NASA
 Michelle L.D. Hanlon, 2020, Is Section 9 The Most Important Part of The Artemis Accords?, Moon Village Association
H. Alshamsi, R. Balleste, M.L.D. Hanlon, 2018, As the Grapefruit Turns Sixty, It's Time to Get Serious about Clean up in Outer Space, J. Air L. & Com. 83, 45
Michelle L.D. Hanlon, 2021, “Due Regard” for Commercial Space Must Start with Historic Preservation, 9 Global Bus. L. Rev. 130
M.L.D. Hanlon & B. Cunningham, 2019, The Legal Imperative to Mitigate the Plume Effect: An “Aggravation and Frustration” that Imperils our History and our Future, Journal of Space Law, Volume 43, number 2
Michelle L.D. Hanlon, 2019, Adapting the ISS Code of Conduct to Form the Foundation of Astrolaw, San Diego International Law Journal, Volume 21
Michelle L.D. Hanlon, 2017, Sexual Hostility a Mile High, Hastings Women's Law Journal, Volume 28, number 2
Michelle L.D. Hanlon, 2018, Here a Spaceport, There a Spaceport, Everywhere a Spaceport, Journal of Space Law, Volume 42

1965 births
Living people
21st-century American women lawyers
21st-century American lawyers
Academic journal editors
Kent School alumni
Georgetown University Law Center alumni
McGill University alumni
University of Missouri School of Law faculty
Yale College alumni